Mira Scherdin Craig (born 31 July 1982) is a Norwegian R&B artist.

Early life

Craig's father is Ronaldo Craig an African American from Baton Rouge, Louisiana. She was born in 1982 in Oslo, and at the age of twelve, Craig performed the Whitney Houston hit "I Wanna Dance with Somebody (Who Loves Me)" on the Norwegian youth TV show Midt i smørøyet. By the age of 15 she had started writing her own songs, and by 17 she was singing back-up vocals for Noora Noor.

Career

In 2000, she made headlines at "Quartfestivalen", a Norwegian music festival, when Wyclef Jean pulled her up on stage. American rap artist Snoop Dogg also took interest in her in 2005 at the same festival, and has since used one of her songs on his compilation Welcome to tha Chuuch: Da Album.

On 21 January 2006 Craig won the Newcomer of The Year award at "Alarm-prisen," a Norwegian music awards show. The same year, readers of Norwegian publication Mann Magazine voted her "Female of the Year".

While opening for the Fugees in 2007, and attempting to stage dive, Craig fell as there were no fans willing to catch her. A concert attendee with a cellphone camera soon put the whole event on popular video website YouTube. In this video, the thud of Craig landing on the concrete is very audible as is the grunt Craig lets out as she had her wind knocked out of her. She shattered her kneecap in the fall.

In 2008, she took part in Norwegian Melodi Grand Prix as a composer. She had written the song "Hold On Be Strong", which was performed by Maria Haukaas Storeng. The song won the right to represent Norway in Belgrade, and at the Eurovision semi-final on 20 May 2008. It finished fourth out of 19, earning a place in the Eurovision final, which took place on 24 May. The song ended in fifth place in the final with 182 points, and Norway got the highest ranking of all the countries in western Europe.

In 2012 she released the lead single from her forthcoming fourth album. The song "Aces High" showed a more rock-oriented direction to her music. The song, however, has not reached the same level of success as her previous singles.

On 10 January 2022 it was announced that Craig would take part in Melodi Grand Prix 2022 with the song "We Still Here".

Discography

Albums

Singles

Guest singles

Other collaborations
 Bigg Snoop Dogg Presents…Welcome to tha Chuuch: Da Album
"Sisters N Brothers" – J. Black featuring Mira Craig, Snoop Dogg
"Dinner in Bed" – Mira Craig
Timbaland Presents Shock Value
"Come and Get Me" (featuring 50 Cent, Tony Yayo and Mira Craig) (Timbaland, co-produced by Danja)
Hold On Be Strong
"Hold On Be Strong" – Maria Haukaas Storeng (Music and lyrics by Mira Craig)
"Mine All Mine" – Maria Haukaas Storeng ft. Mira Craig
Fighter Girl promo single
"Fighter Girl" – Mira Craig & Samsaya, featuring Elvira Nikolaisen, Bertine Zetlitz, Elisabeth Carew, Ida Maria, Maria Mena & Sichelle

References

External links
 Official site 
 MiraCraigFan – Mira Craig Fansite

1982 births
Living people
Melodi Grand Prix composers
Melodi Grand Prix contestants
Norwegian people of African-American descent
Norwegian people of American descent
English-language singers from Norway
21st-century Norwegian singers
21st-century Norwegian women singers